De Salis Bay is a Canadian Arctic waterway in the Northwest Territories.  It is a northern arm of Amundsen Gulf on southeastern Banks Island where dry tundra is found. The bay was named for the De Salis family by Francis Leopold McClintock while serving with Henry Kellett.

References

External links
 Photos, 1952

Bays of the Northwest Territories
Bays of the Arctic Ocean